James K. Polk (1795–1849) was the president of the United States from 1845 to 1849.

James Polk may also refer to:
 James Polk (journalist) (1937–2021), American journalist
 James H. Polk (1911–1992), United States Army four-star general who served as Commander-in-Chief of United States Army Europe 1967–1971
 James G. Polk (1896–1959), U.S. Congressman from Ohio
 USS James K. Polk (SSBN-645), a United States Navy ballistic missile submarine
 "James K. Polk" (song), a song by They Might Be Giants

See also
 Presidency of James K. Polk

Polk, James